Bob Sellers is a Newsmax TV anchor, an executive at public relations firm MediaStars Worldwide, and the
author of the book Forbes Best Business Mistakes. Sellers is a former CNBC and Fox News anchor.

Network Television 
Sellers was an anchor on CNBC during the dot.com boom and bust. He co-anchored Today's Business' and Market Watch in addition to filling in as anchor on programs such as Squawk Box and Power Lunch. He joined Fox News Channel in 2002, regularly anchoring  Fox News Live. He also reported live from Iraq during June 2003. Currently, he is a news anchor on NewsMaxTV and co-host of American Agenda.

Local Television 
Sellers worked for KING-TV in Seattle, WA, KENS-TV in San Antonio, TX, and KTVL in Medford, OR. He joined WTTG Fox 5 Morning News in Washington, DC in 2006 where he served as a morning news anchor until July 2008. He then went to WSMV in Nashville where he was the primary anchor. While at WSMV, Sellers won an Emmy in 2010 for coverage of historic floods in the area.  After leaving WSMV-TV, Sellers joined WZTV as morning news anchor.  He left WZTV in June 2016.

Author 
In 2010, Sellers wrote, Forbes Best Business Mistakes: How Today's Top Business Leaders Turned Missteps Into Success Sellers interviewed Jack Welch, Peter Lynch, Jim Cramer, Suze Orman, & Jason Kilar. Sellers has written business columns for Success and Gear magazines and occasionally writes for The Huffington Post.

Education 
He was drafted by the Kansas City Royals in the 31st round of the draft, but did not sign. Instead, Sellers attended and graduated from the University of Virginia with a Bachelor of Arts in Government and Foreign Affairs. He attended the university on a baseball scholarship. He has recently served on the Board of Advisors for the Media Studies Department.

References

External links
Official Bio
 Bio on FoxNews.com
Forbes Best Business Mistakes
Huffington Post articles

Sellars, Bob
American television reporters and correspondents
Television anchors from Washington, D.C.
Living people
CNBC people
Fox News people
Newsmax TV people
Virginia Cavaliers baseball players
Year of birth missing (living people)
21st-century American journalists